Coldharbour ward is an administrative division of the London Borough of Lambeth. It is located in Brixton.

Demographics
Coldharbour has a large population compared to other wards (17,200). It has a young age profile, with a high proportion of children aged 0–15.

It is also the poorest ward in the borough. It has the highest proportion of people from ethnic minorities, and a high proportion of people not born in UK. 4.8% of Coldharbour residents speak an African language as their first language, and 4% speak Portuguese.

Coldharbour has the highest proportion of Black Caribbean residents, and the highest proportion of Black African residents. Less than a quarter of residents are White British.

Much of the ward takes in less affluent estates, such as the Loughborough, Hertford, Angell Town and Moorlands Estates. There is also a pocket of considerable affluence in the far south of the ward.

Notable events
The 1981 Brixton riot, the most serious riot in the United Kingdom during the 20th century, started in the ward. The George public house was burnt down and a number of other buildings were damaged along Railton Road.

Lambeth Council elections 

 

 

Rachel Heywood was elected as a Labour Councillor. Heywood resigned the party whip in April 2016 and now sits as an Independent councillor.

Notable former residents
AJ Tracey, rapper and musician
Levi Roots, rapper, musician and entrepreneur 
John Major, former Prime Minister of the United Kingdom, who lived along Coldharbour Lane 
 C. L. R. James, the writer and black political activist, lived in Railton Road, above the offices of Race Today.
 Big Narstie, rapper and musician
 La Roux (Elly Jackson), musician, born and raised in Brixton

Notes

References

External links
Lambeth Borough Council profile for the ward
Coldharbour ward election results on Lambeth website
Labour in Coldharbour website

Wards of the London Borough of Lambeth
Brixton